Chester T. Lane (1905–1959) was counsel to the newly formed Security and Exchange Commission, a Lend-Lease administrator, and later, as a partner at Beer, Richards, Lane, Haller & Buttenwieser, served as defense counsel to Alger Hiss during appeal.

Background
Chester Tevis Lane was born on June 7, 1905, in London, United Kingdom, to American parents.  He had two siblings, a brother and sister.  In 1926, he graduated from Harvard University.  In 1930, he graduated from Harvard Law School, where he also taught and tutored in classics.  In 1931, he passed the New York bar.

Career

In 1931, Lane went to work at the law firm Murray, Aldrich & Webb, after which that firm merged into Milbank LLP, Tweed, Hope & Webb.

In 1935, Lane joined the staff of the newly formed Security and Exchange Commission (SEC) as counsel; in January 1937, he became assistant general counsel.  In 1938, he became SEC general counsel.

During World War II, Lane served as special assistant to the United States Attorney General:  associate chief of the Special War Policies Unit at the Justice Department (1942), chairman of Justice's Civilian Legal Personnel Commission (1942), head of post-war Lend-Lease Administration and senior consultant to the Army-Navy Liquidation Commission.

In 1947, Lane returned to private practice by helping form Beer, Richards, Lane, Haller & Buttenwieser.  He worked there through 1959 and specialized in Securities Regulation, Administrative Law, Trademarks, and Unfair Competition.  In 1949, he began lecturing at the New York University Law School until his death in 1959. Harold Rosenwald (one of the first lawyers to join the Alger Hiss defense team) was a member of the firm.

Hiss case appeal

In 1950, Lane became defense counsel to Alger Hiss in his appeal on conviction for two counts of perjury in January 1950.  The appeal started in 1950 as United States vs. Alger Hiss, 185 F. 2d 822 with appellant counsel listed as Robert M. Benjamin, Harold Rosenwald, Chester T. Lane, and Kenneth Simon.

In January 1952, Lane's defense begin; it focused on attacking the Woodstock N230099 typewriter as "planted."  Lane cited expert Dr. Daniel P. Norman of Skinner & Sherman (Boston) (who found that typewriter had been "altered" by soldering new typeface "sloppily" some time before the Hiss defense team discovered the typewriter on April 16, 1949), so that Lane concluded that testimony by Whittaker Chambers regarding the "Baltimore Documents" was a "fabrication."

In April 1952, The New York Times covered Lane's efforts, reporting how Lane called testimony by Chambers "false," claimed that "his fraudulent plot now stands exposed," and stated he had new evidence that showed untrue that Hiss' wife, Priscilla Hiss, had typed up State Department documents on the Woodstock typewriter.  Lane speculated, "Some signs point to the conclusion that, though his personal interest may have been to protect himself in the libel suit [$75.000 libel action brought by Hiss against Mr. Chambers], the availability of the means for such self-preservation may have been part of a much larger scheme involving other people and for larger objectives than the mere framing of Alger Hiss."

The appeal continued as United States of America, Appellee, v. Alger Hiss, Appellant, 201 F.2d 372 (2d Cir. 1953), with counsel listed as Chester T. Lane, Robert M. Benjamin and Helen L. Buttenwieser.

Lane's efforts proved unsuccessful.

Personal life and death
In 1927, Lane married Persis McClennen; they had four children.

Lane was a member of the American Bar Association and of the Association of the Bar of the City of New York.

Chester T. Lane died age 53 on March 13, 1959, in New York City of a heart attack.

Works
 De Spe Harvardiana loquitur C.T. Lane (1926)
 Reminiscences of Chester Tevis Lane (1951)

See also
 Alger Hiss
 Helen Buttenwieser
 Harold Rosenwald
 Security and Exchange Commission

References

External sources
 Harvard University:  Chester T. Lane SEC briefs (1937–1942)
 SEC:  Chester T. Lane opinion 1940
 SEC:  Chester T. Lane speeches 1939
 SEC:  Chester T. Lane speeches 1938

1905 births
1959 deaths
20th-century American lawyers
Harvard Law School alumni
British emigrants to the United States
Harvard College alumni